Rhynchomolgidae is a family of cyclopoid copepods in the order Cyclopoida. There are more than 40 genera and 280 described species in Rhynchomolgidae.

Genera
These 47 genera belong to the family Rhynchomolgidae:

 Acanthomolgus Humes & Stock, 1972
 Alcyonomolgus Humes, 1990
 Anisomolgus Humes & Stock, 1972
 Ascetomolgus Humes & Stock, 1972
 Aspidomolgus Humes, 1969
 Calonastes Humes & Goenaga, 1978
 Calonnstes
 Colobomolgus Humes & Stock, 1972
 Contomolgus Humes & Stock, 1972
 Critomolgus Humes & Stock, 1983
 Diallagomolgus Humes, 1979
 Doridicola Leydig, 1853
 Emunoa Humes, 1996
 Indomolgus H.o.Humes, 1966
 Isomolgus Dojiri, 1988
 Kombia Humes, 1962
 Lambanetes Humes, 1982
 Lutumidomus Kim I.H., 2006
 Mandobius Humes, 1991
 Mecra Humes, 1980
 Meringomolgus Humes & Stock, 1972
 Moluccomolgus Humes, 1992
 Monomolgus Humes & Frost, 1964
 Notoxynus Humes, 1975
 Numboa Humes, 1997
 Pachysericola Kim I.H., 2003
 Paradoridicola Humes & Stock, 1972
 Paramolgus Humes & Stock, 1972
 Paranthessius Claus, 1889
 Paredromolgus Humes & Stock, 1972
 Pennatulicola Humes & Stock, 1972
 Perosyna Humes, 1982
 Pionomolgus Dojiri & Grygier, 1990
 Plesiomolgus Humes & Stock, 1972
 Ravahina H.o.Humes, 1968
 Rhynchomolgus H.o.Humes, 1967
 Solitaricola Stock, 1985
 Spaniomolgus Humes & Stock, 1972,2018
 Telestacicola Humes & Stock, 1972
 Temnomolgus H.o.Humes, 1966
 Verutipes Humes, 1982
 Visayasia Humes, 1992
 Wedanus Humes, 1978
 Xenomolgus Humes & Stock, 1972
 Zamolgus Humes & Stock, 1972
 Zndomolgus
 Zsomolgus

References

Cyclopoida
Articles created by Qbugbot
Crustacean families